Wave is the fourteenth studio album by Japanese jazz fusion band T-Square. It was released on March 21, 1989. It was the first studio album by the band to be released under the name T-Square, whereas the previous albums released from 1978 to 1988 were under the name of "The Square".

Track listing
Sources

References

T-Square (band) albums
1989 albums